Hypenella is a genus of flies in the family Empididae.

Species
H. bhura Smith, 1965
H. empodiata Collin, 1941
H. spumarius Smith, 1965

References

Empidoidea genera
Empididae